Paarl Boys' High School, known in Afrikaans as Hoër Jongenskool Paarl (also known as Boishaai) is one of the oldest schools in South Africa, built in 1868. The school is situated in Paarl, a town in the Western Cape province of South Africa. The first headmaster of the school was George Jeffreys. As of 2007 the headmaster of the school is Derek Swart.

War Cry

The Paarl Boys' High War cry, or 'Kreet', has changed much over the years, but the current Warcry is as follows:
 
Shimalaya wha!
 
Shimalaya wha!
 
HJS HJS
 
Wha 'sop - 'sop 'sop 'sop
 
We are - we are
 
HJS HJS
 
 
Wha 'sop, Shimalaya wha!

Headmasters

G Jeffreys              1868 - 1873

J Hoffman             1873 - 1876

T Walker                 1876 - 1877

H Nixon                  1878 - 1882

B le Roux               1882 - 1887

J Zahn                   1887 - 1888

J Rettie                  1889 - 1895

CEZ Watermeyer  1896

MC Fourie              1897 - 1901

PJ du Pré le Roux 1901 - 1924

SJ Malherbe         1924 - 1940

GJ Pretorius         1941 - 1958

Dr JAC Visagie     1959 - 1960

HA Lambrechts    1961

Dr PS Meyer          1962 - 1966

CD Koch                1967 - 1974

TW Engela             1975 - 1989

L Knoetze              1990 - 2007

D Swart                  2007 -

Early history
The first building to house the school was a granary on Zeederbergplein, the owner of which was D Beyers. The first years of the school were unstable ones, with the school increasing in size every year, and larger facilities were required frequently. The grounds on which the school stands today were originally formed part of the farm Berlyn owned by PJ Malherbe. A certain Mr Moll purchased the farm and donated the land to the school.

In 1901 PJ du Pré Le Roux became headmaster. Du Pré Le Roux was the first headmaster to establish the school and remained at the reins for over two decades. Le Roux also saw the construction of the boarding hostels of Monte Bello (1901), Bellevue (1904), Villieria (1907), Berlyn (1908) and Imhoff (1923). The hostels of Berlyn and Villieria were dismantled and were replaced by another hostel, namely Werda.

Sport
Each year the school takes part in one of the biggest interschool events in South Africa against its arch-rival, Paarl Gimnasium High School. The main event (the u/19A rugby match) attracts over 20 000 spectators to the Faure Street Stadium.  The school has produced many Springboks, from Boy Louw, Mannetjies Roux and "Prince of Wings" Carel du Plessis, to more recent players like Corné Krige (former Springbok Captain), Gurthro Steenkamp, Frans Malherbe, Thomas du Toit, Salmaan Moerat and Evan Roos.

Other sports that are also included in the interschool events are: field hockey, cricket, swimming, tennis, chess, golf, Golfing professional, David Frost, also matriculated at Paarl Boys' High. Paarl Boys' High School is currently ranked as one of the top rugby schools in South Africa.

Students of the 2 schools have traditional nicknames; the Boishaaiers are known as 'galpille' and the Gimmies as 'bloedworse'.

Notable old boys 

List of the old boys that were matriculated in Paarl Boys High School. 
 Jim Fouché - Former State President of South Africa 
 Eugène Marais - South African barrister, poet and writer.
 Boy Louw - South African rugby player.
 Christo Wiese - South African businessman and billionaire.
 Carel du Plessis - South African rugby player
 Corné Krige - South African rugby player.
 David Frost - South African golfer.
 David Meihuizen - South African rugby player
 Frans Malherbe - South African rugby player.
 Gurthrö Steenkamp - South African rugby player.
 Jean-Luc du Plessis - Provincial rugby player
 Wium Basson - South African rugby player
 Wilhelm van der Sluys - Provincial rugby player
 Mannetjies Roux - South African rugby player.
 Thomas du Toit - South African rugby player.
 Dawid Malan - English professional cricketer.
 Bjorn Fortuin - South African cricketer.
 Evan Roos - South African rugby player

References

Schools in the Western Cape
Paarl
Educational institutions established in 1868
1868 establishments in the Cape Colony